Arkalgud Assembly constituency is one of the 225 constituencies in the Karnataka Legislative Assembly of Karnataka a south state of India. Arkalgud is also part of Hassan Lok Sabha constituency.

Members of Legislative Assembly 
Source:

See also
 Arkalgud
 Hassan district
 List of constituencies of Karnataka Legislative Assembly

References

Assembly constituencies of Karnataka
Hassan district